S. spectabilis may refer to:

Sabellastarte spectabilis, a marine worm species
Saproscincus spectabilis, a lizard species
Selenidera spectabilis, the yellow-eared toucanet, a bird species
Senna spectabilis, a flowering plant species
Solaster spectabilis, a starfish species
Solidago spectabilis, a flowering plant species
Somateria spectabilis, the king eider, a duck species
Streptomyces spectabilis, a bacterium species